CP 450 was a large cabinet containing a floppy disk drive interface, exactly like the TRS-80 Color Computer, manufactured by Prológica, a computer company located in Brazil.

General information

The standard operating system is DOS-400, an adapted and renamed copy of disk Extended Color BASIC (DECB or RSDOS). It was also possible to run other operating systems, such as Microware OS-09 and TSC Flex9. Using OS-9 allowed the user to access all 64 KB of RAM available on this particular version of the CP 400.

The CP 450 units stopped being manufactured at the end of 1986, along with other accessories suitable for the CP 400.

Bibliography
 Micro Computador - Curso Básico. Rio de Janeiro: Rio Gráfica, 1984, v. 1, pp. 49–50.
 ABREU, Carlos Alberto C. 77 programas para linha TRS-80. Rio de Janeiro: Microkit, 1985.

References 

Computer-related introductions in 1984